Pandurangapuram or Panduranga Puram is a village in Kurnool district, Andhra Pradesh, India. It should not be confused with the village of that name in Khammam district as well as near the bapatla, guntur district.

Nearby villages
 East - Kanala
 North - Chapirevula
 West  - Thogarcheedu

References

External links
 Village website

Villages in Nandyal district